Xtreem Music is an independent Spanish record label, founded after the collapse of Repulse Records in 2002, and managed by Dave Rotten. It mainly produces extreme metal and black metal bands.

On April 11, Xtreem Music announced that Iranian death metal band, Azooma have signed a worldwide contract with the record label.

Bands 
 Altar of Sin
 Holocausto Canibal
 Kronos
 Avulsed
 Murder Death Kill
 Abaddon Incarnate
 Anvil of Doom
 Demigod
 Funebre
 Paganizer
 Vorkreist
 Azooma
 Dying Out Flame
 Mental Demise
 Fleshgore
Cerebral Fix
 Grim Fate

See also
 List of record labels

External links

References

Spanish independent record labels
Heavy metal record labels
Death metal record labels
Black metal record labels